This is a list of settlements in Chalkidiki, Greece.

 Afytos
 Agia Paraskevi
 Agios Mamas
 Agios Nikolaos
 Agios Panteleimonas
 Agios Pavlos
 Agios Prodromos
 Ammouliani
 Arnaia
 Chaniotis
 Dionysiou
 Doumpia
 Elaiochoria
 Flogita
 Fourka
 Galarinos
 Galatista
 Geroplatanos
 Gomati
 Ierissos
 Kalandra
 Kallithea
 Kalyves
 Kassandreia
 Kassandrino
 Krimni
 Krini
 Kryopigi
 Lakkoma
 Marathoussa
 Megali Panagia
 Metagkitsi
 Metamorfosi
 Nea Fokaia
 Nea Gonia
 Kallikrateia
 Nea Moudania
 Nea Plagia
 Nea Poteidaia
 Nea Roda
 Nea Silata
 Nea Skioni
 Nea Tenedos
 Nea Triglia
 Neochori
 Neos Marmaras
 Nikiti
 Olympiada
 Olynthos
 Ormylia
 Ouranoupoli
 Palaiochora
 Palaiochori
 Palaiokastro
 Paliouri
 Pefkochori
 Petralona
 Polychrono 
 Polygyros
 Portaria
 Psakoudia
 Pyrgadikia also known in the ancient world as Piloros
 Riza
 Sana
 Sarti
 Simantra
 Stagira
 Stanos
 Stratoni
 Stratoniki
 Sykia
 Taxiarchis
 Vardos
 Varvara
 Vrastama
 Yerakini
 Zografou

By municipality

See also

List of towns and villages in Greece

 
Chalcidice